Richard John "Dick" Grayson is a superhero appearing in American comic books published by DC Comics, commonly in association with Batman and Teen Titans. Created by writer Bill Finger and artist Bob Kane, he first appeared in Detective Comics #38 in April 1940 as the original and most popular incarnation of Robin, Batman's crime-fighting partner. In Tales of the Teen Titans #44 (July 1984), the character, after becoming a young adult, retires his role as Robin and assumes the superhero persona of Nightwing (created by Marv Wolfman and artist George Pérez).

The youngest in a family of acrobats known as the "Flying Graysons", Grayson witnesses a mafia boss named Tony Zucco kill his parents to extort money from the circus that employed them. After the tragic murder, Batman (Bruce Wayne) takes Grayson in as his legal ward and trains him to become his crime-fighting partner Robin. He is written by many authors as the first son of Batman. As well as being Batman's crime-fighting partner, Grayson establishes himself as the leader of the Teen Titans, DC's first team of teenage superheroes. As a young man, he retires as Robin and takes on his own superhero identity, becoming Nightwing. As Nightwing, he continues to lead the Teen Titans, the Titans, and later, the Outsiders. In the first volume of his eponymous series (1996–2009), he becomes the protector of Blüdhaven, Gotham's economically troubled neighboring city, the locale the character is most closely associated with. He has also been depicted as protecting the streets of New York, Chicago, and Gotham City over the years.

Grayson has also taken on the identity of Batman on a few occasions. In the aftermath of Batman: Knightfall, he was not offered the role of Batman while Wayne was recovering from a broken back because he felt that Nightwing was a hero in his own right and not Batman's understudy, but after the events of the Zero Hour miniseries later that year, Grayson temporarily fills in as Batman, beginning in Robin (Vol. 2) #0 (1994) and extending throughout the Batman: Prodigal storyline in 1995. Grayson again assumes the mantle following the events of "Batman R.I.P." (2008) and Final Crisis (2008–2009). As Batman, he moves to Gotham City following his mentor's apparent death and partners with the fifth Robin, Damian Wayne. Following Wayne's return, both men maintained the Batman identity until 2011, when Grayson returned to the Nightwing identity with DC's New 52 continuity reboot. In a 2014 comic story, he is forced to abandon the Nightwing identity after being unmasked on TV, and faking his death, setting up Tim Seeley's Grayson comic book, Dick becomes Agent 37, Batman's mole in the nefarious spy organization Spyral. Following the conclusion of the Grayson series, and the restoration of his secret identity in the series' final issue, he returns to being Nightwing as part of the DC Rebirth relaunch in 2016. During the Tom King's Batman run and after the frustrating marriage between Wayne and Selina Kyle, Grayson is also seen taking the mantle during the first part of the "Cold Days" arc, as Wayne is confined in a jury while Mr. Freeze is on trial.

Dick Grayson has appeared as Robin in several other media adaptations: the 1943 serial played by Douglas Croft, the 1949 serial played by Johnny Duncan, the 1966–1968 live action Batman television series and its motion picture portrayed by Burt Ward, and played by Chris O'Donnell in the 1995 film Batman Forever and its 1997 sequel, Batman & Robin. Dick Grayson appears in the Titans television series for the DC Universe streaming service and HBO Max played by Brenton Thwaites. Loren Lester voiced the character Robin in Batman: The Animated Series and later as Nightwing's first screen adaptation in The New Batman Adventures, Jesse McCartney voices Grayson as both Robin and Nightwing in Young Justice: The Animated Series, Sean Maher voices Nightwing in the DC Animated Movie Universe, and Michael Cera voices an overly cheerful Grayson as Robin in The Lego Batman Movie. In May 2011, IGN ranked Dick Grayson No. 11 on their list of the "Top 100 Super Heroes of All Time". In 2013, ComicsAlliance ranked Grayson as Nightwing as No. 1 on its list of the "50 Sexiest Male Characters in Comics".

Publication history

Robin the Boy Wonder
The character was first introduced in Detective Comics #38 (1940) by Batman creators Bill Finger and Bob Kane. Robin's debut was an effort to get younger readers to enjoy Batman. The name "Robin, The Boy Wonder" and the medieval look of the original costume are inspired by the legendary hero Robin Hood. Finger had named Dick Grayson after both the half-brother of pulp fiction character Frank Merriwell, also named Dick, and book editor Charles Grayson, Jr. The costume was designed by Jerry Robinson who drew it from memory based on Robin Hood illustrations by N. C. Wyeth.

In his first appearance, Dick Grayson is a circus acrobat, and, with his parents, one of the "Flying Graysons". Robin was born on the first day of spring, the son of John Grayson and Mary Grayson, a young aerialist couple. While preparing for a performance, Dick overhears two gangsters attempting to extort protection money from the circus owner. The owner refuses, so the gangsters sabotage the trapeze wires with acid. During the next performance, the trapeze from which Dick's parents are swinging snaps, sending them to their deaths. Before he can go to the police, Batman appears to him and warns him that the two gangsters work for Tony Zucco, a very powerful crime boss and that revealing his knowledge could lead to his death. When Batman recounts the murder of his own parents, Dick asks to become his aide. After extensive training, Dick becomes Robin. They start by disrupting Zucco's gambling and extortion rackets. They then successfully bait the riled Zucco into visiting a construction site, where they capture him.

Robin's origin has a thematic connection to Batman's in that both see their parents killed by criminals, creating an urge to battle the criminal element. Bruce sees a chance to direct the anger and rage that Dick feels in a way that he cannot, thus creating a father/son bond and understanding between the two. Throughout the 1940s and 1950s, DC Comics portrayed Batman and Robin as a team, deeming them the "Dynamic Duo", rarely publishing a Batman story without his sidekick; stories entirely devoted to Robin appeared in Star-Spangled Comics from 1947 through 1952.

The character history of the Earth-Two Robin accordingly adopts all of the earliest stories featuring the character from the 1940s and 1950s, while the adventures of the mainstream Robin (who lived on "Earth-One") begin later and with certain elements of his origin retold. Both were depicted as separate, though parallel, individuals living in their respective universes, with the "older" Earth-Two character eventually reaching death in Crisis on Infinite Earths.

Teen Titans 
1964's The Brave and the Bold #54 introduces a junior version of the Justice League of America. This team is led by the modern-day Robin, residing on Earth-One, and was joined by two other teenage sidekicks, Aqualad (sidekick of Aquaman) and Kid Flash (sidekick of the Flash), to stop the menace of Mr. Twister. Later, the three sidekicks join forces with Speedy (sidekick of Green Arrow) and Wonder Girl to free their mentors in the JLA from mind-controlled thrall. They decide to become a real team: the Teen Titans. By the tactical skills gleaned from Batman, Robin is swiftly recognized as a leader before the Titans disband some years later.

In 1969, still in the Pre-Crisis continuity, writer Dennis O'Neil and artist Neal Adams return Batman to his darker roots. One part of this effort is writing Robin out of the series by sending Dick Grayson to Hudson University and into a separate strip in the back of Detective Comics. The by-now Teen Wonder appears only sporadically in Batman stories of the 1970s as well as in a short-lived revival of The Teen Titans.

New Teen Titans, New Titans, Tales of Teen Titans (1980-1996) 
In October 1980,  a new roster of the Teen Titans was featured in DC Comics Presents #26  featuring Robin, Wonder Girl, and Kid Flash. Given a series of their starring writer Marv Wolfman and artist George Pérez, later additions to the team would include Changeling (Beast Boy), Raven, Cyborg, and Starfire. The New Teen Titans are run by Marv Wolfman, George Perez, and editor Len Wein.  With Marvel outperforming DC Comics in sales, the then-new President of DC Comics Jenette Khan brought in the aforementioned team who would choose to use the Teen Titans characters in a bid to revitalize sales. During the comic's run, the series was among DC's most popular selling books. outperforming much of the other titles featuring more popular characters.  During his leadership of the Titans, however, he had a falling out with Batman, leading to an estrangement that would last for years.

Nightwing
In the pre-Crisis on Infinite Earths continuity, the maturing Dick Grayson grows weary of his role as Batman's young sidekick. He renames himself Nightwing, recalling his adventure in the Kryptonian city of Kandor, where he and Batman meet the local hero of the same name. In post-Crisis continuity, he is fired by Batman after being shot by the Joker and becomes Nightwing. He maintains this identity during his role in the Teen Titans and occasionally returns to assist Batman and his successors as Robin in the form of Jason Todd and Tim Drake, Tim, in particular, becoming a younger brother figure to him.

When Bruce's back is broken by Bane during the Knightfall story arc, Bruce selects Jean-Paul Valley as his replacement as Batman as he does not want to burden Dick with the role and fears that Dick may go after Bane in revenge. However, when Valley proves to be too unstable to be Batman, Bruce undergoes a rigorous recovery and training program with the aid of Doctor Shondra Kinsolving and Lady Shiva to restore him to full health, defeating Valley with Dick and Tim's aid. However, feeling that he needs to re-evaluate Batman and his mission after Valley's defeat, Bruce leaves Gotham once again, after appointing Dick as his successor during the "Prodigal" story arc. While acting as Batman, Dick is left with a clearer idea of the psychological stresses Bruce must endure in the role, as well as facing some of Bruce's newer enemies—such as Killer Croc, the Ventriloquist, and the Ratcatcher—while settling his long-standing issues with Two-Face.

Miniseries and afterward
In Nightwing: Alfred's Return #1 (1995), Dick Grayson travels to England to find Alfred Pennyworth who had resigned from Bruce Wayne's service following the events of the KnightSaga. Before returning to Gotham City together, they prevent an attempted coup d'état against the British government that involves destroying the Channel Tunnel under the English Channel.

Later on, with the Nightwing miniseries (September to December 1995, written by Dennis O'Neil with Greg Land as an artist), Dick briefly considers retiring from being Nightwing forever before family papers uncovered by Alfred reveals a possible link between the murder of the Flying Graysons and the Crown Prince of Kravis. Journeying to Kravis, Nightwing helps to topple the murderous Kravian leader and prevent ethnic cleansing, while learning his parents' true connection to the Prince; they witnessed the original Prince being killed and replaced with an impostor who became as bad as his predecessor (although Zucco killed the Graysons before the conspirators could do anything about it). In the aftermath, Dick returns to his role as Nightwing, recognizing that, for all his problems with Bruce, Bruce never made him become Robin or join his crusade, accepting that he imitated Bruce's example because Bruce was worthy of imitation.

In 1996, following the success of the miniseries, DC Comics launched a monthly solo series featuring Nightwing (written by Chuck Dixon, with art by Scott McDaniel), in which he patrols Gotham City's neighboring municipality of Blüdhaven, relocating there to investigate a series of murders and remaining as he recognized that the city needed protection. He remains the city's guardian for some time, facing foes such as Blockbuster and new villains such as Torque, and even becomes a police officer so that he can make an impact on the city's criminal activity in both parts of his life. Later, Grayson divides his duties between Bludhaven and Gotham after a devastating earthquake and the subsequent decision to declare Gotham a No Man's Land, Grayson occasionally assisting his mentor and other members of Bat-Family in maintaining and restoring order in Gotham until it is fully rebuilt. When the Justice League vanished into the past fighting an ancient sorceress Gamemnae, Nightwing was selected as the leader of the reserve League created by an emergency program Batman had established in the event of his League being defeated, Batman described Nightwing as the only person he could have picked to lead the new team.

Eventually, the original League is restored, and Nightwing departs along with some of his League-although others remain as some of the original team take a leave of absence-although Batman notes that his leadership of the League proves that he is ready for more responsibilities. However, the death of Blockbuster prompts Nightwing to leave Bludhaven due to his crisis of conscience; Blockbuster was killed by a vigilante Tarantula and Nightwing did not stop it even when he had the chance to do so. While Nightwing returns to Gotham to heal after assisting Batman in dealing with a series of gang wars, Blüdhaven is destroyed by the Secret Society of Super-Villains when they drop Chemo on it.

During the battle of Metropolis, Grayson suffers a near-fatal injury from Alexander Luthor, Jr. when he shields Wayne from Luthor's attack. Originally, the editors at DC intended to have Grayson killed in Infinite Crisis as Newsarama revealed from the DC Panel at WizardWorld Philadelphia:

After spending some time away with Bruce and Tim to heal and rebuild after their harsh times before the Crisis, Dick relocates to New York but has trouble finding work as both Dick Grayson and Nightwing. During the Batman R.I.P. storyline, Nightwing is ambushed by the International Club of Villains. He is later seen being held in Arkham Asylum, where one of the surgeons, in reality also the civilian identity of ICoV member Le Bossu, arranged for Nightwing to be admitted under the name of Pierrot Lunaire (another ICoV member) and be kept both heavily drugged and regularly beaten by staff to subdue him. Scheduled for an experimental lobotomy by Le Bossu himself, he manages to free himself and come to Batman's aid for the finale of the story arc.

Batman: Reborn
Following the events of Batman's apparent death during the Final Crisis, Nightwing has closed down shop in New York to return to Gotham, where after the events of "Battle for the Cowl", he assumes the identity of Batman, with Damian Wayne, Bruce Wayne's biological son, as the new Robin.

The new team of Batman and Robin is the focus of Grant Morrison and Frank Quitely's Batman and Robin series. Their dynamic reverses the classic dynamic of Bruce and Dick, by having a lighter and friendlier Batman paired with a more intense and dark Robin. Over time, Dick's experience as the Dark Knight would harden his personality as his mentor.

During this period, Dick Grayson as Batman also features as a member of the Justice League in a short-lived run by the writer James Robinson. After an intense confrontation with the Club of Villains and the mysterious Doctor Simon Hurt (who has established fake evidence that he is Bruce's father Thomas Wayne), Hurt is defeated when Bruce returns to the present. However, Bruce leaves Dick to continue to act as Batman in Gotham with Damian as his partner while he sets up the new 'Batman Incorporated' program, Bruce publicly identifying himself as Batman's financial backer to justify a global Batman-themed operation where he funds multiple other vigilantes.

The New 52 (2011–2016)

Dick Grayson is re-established as Nightwing following DC's Flashpoint crossover event, after which the publisher relaunched all of its titles and made alterations to its continuity as part of an initiative called The New 52. In the new status quo, Bruce Wayne is once again the only Batman, and Dick, like the other members of the adoptive family, is a few years younger. Dick, despite being 19 is drawn a bit shorter than in his pre-relaunch frame. This is likely due to adding believability to his acrobat past. His origin story remains the same (Bruce Wayne takes him in upon his parents' murder by Zucco) except that Dick prodigiously talented at reading body language, allowing him to deduce Batman's secret identity upon their first meeting.

According to various interviews it is stated that Dick was adopted at 16 as opposed to as an adult due to the DCNU's timeline existing for only five years. Dick Grayson is shown in flashbacks as Robin with a revamped version of the Robin costume in Nightwing (vol. 3) #0 (November 2012) and Batman and Robin (vol. 2) Annual #2 (March 2014).

In his civilian identity, he is attacked by an assassin named Saiko who insists that he is the fiercest killer in Gotham. The series Batman Incorporated relaunches with a second volume, continuing its story while taking into account the New 52's continuity changes; Dick is now depicted as Nightwing, and not as Batman, but the change is not addressed in the comic itself. In Nightwing, Dick inherits the deed to the circus from a dying C. C. Haly and begins a relationship with his childhood friend acrobat Raya Vestri. Saiko tortures Haly for information on Nightwing's secret identity, and the old man dies in Dick's arms after telling him the circus holds a terrible secret. Investigating leads, he tracks down a supervillain named Feedback, who used to be a childhood friend but does not learn anything. Following Haly's clues, he finds a mysterious Book of Names in the circus that has his name on the last page. Later the circus announces they will be doing a memorial show on the anniversary of the night Dick's parents were murdered, and Saiko attacks by detonating a massive explosion.

It is then revealed that the circus has been training assassins for years, and Saiko was a childhood friend using Raya as an accomplice. Grayson had been selected to become a new Talon for the Court of Owls, but when Batman adopted him, Saiko took his place. The killer plummets to his death and Raya turns herself in. Returning to the Batcave, Bruce reveals to Dick that the current Talon is his great-grandfather William Cobb. During the Night of the Owls event Dick faces Cobb, who was revived while protecting Mayor Hady. Following the event, Dick decided to keep Haly's Circus in Gotham and plans to invest in turning an abandoned amusement park into their new location without Bruce's money. He works with Sonia Branch, the daughter of Tony Zucco, the crime boss who murdered Dick's parents, into getting a loan for this plan by investing his entire trust fund despite being a high-risk due to Saiko's recent attack. The problems arise because of the guilt Sonia feels towards her father's actions  and many members of the circus are afraid for their lives because of the previous disasters and accuse Dick Grayson of being a flake, making it hard for those who choose to stay.

The "Death of the Family" crossover event across the Batman-related comic books led to a major shift in Nightwing's status quo. During the storyline, one of Dick's friends Jimmy Clark, who worked as a circus clown, was murdered by the Joker because Joker felt like Jimmy was a knockoff of him. Nightwing later discovers Joker broke Raya out of prison, infected her with his Joker venom, and forced her to fight him while wearing a makeshift Nightwing costume. The toxin eventually killed Raya, though Nightwing tried in vain with an anti-toxin to save her. Nightwing then discovered that Joker left a message on Raya's abdomen that he was targeting Haly's Circus next. However upon arriving there, Joker unveils his plan to burn the circus to the ground and then infects Nightwing with his gas which not only causes him to experience hallucinations of Jimmy and Raya but he is soon attacked by the other members of Haly's Circus that were also affected by the toxin allowing Joker to capture him.

In the aftermath, Haly's Circus is gone, with Dick breaking as a result of having lost his investment. While the other circus members survived since Joker used a different Joker venom on them, they blame Dick and decide to leave after Raya and Jimmy's funeral, though deep down they know it is not his fault. Dick becomes bitter about his loss. After he used excessive force to bring down some criminals that tried to plunder valuables from the remains of the circus, Damian, who has been monitoring him, can talk some sense into Nightwing, which helps him recover.

Nightwing is later deeply affected by the death of Damian following his murder at the hands of Damian's clone, the Heretic, in Batman Incorporated. With Damian's death and potential resurrection becoming an obsession of Batman's, Dick is shunned by Bruce when he tries to tell him to move on, in Batman and Nightwing (a retitled Batman & Robin #23).

Later, the Nightwing series changes its setting to Chicago, Illinois. Sonia Branch reveals to Dick an e-mail that indicates that her father Zucco is still alive. After giving the address to Red Robin to try and track down who sent it, Robin uncovers that Zucco is residing in Chicago. Nightwing moves to Chicago to find and arrest Zucco, who is now living under the assumed identity of Billy Lester, an assistant to the mayor. Soon after arriving in Chicago, Dick meets his new roommates, a photojournalist named Michael and a computer specialist named Joey. After leaving the apartment to meet with Johnny Spade, a borderline criminal who steals and sells information, their meeting is interrupted by the police. A short chase results in the accidental destruction of a newly rebuilt subway. Meanwhile, a criminal hacker called the Prankster tortures, maims, and kills criminals con men who are untouchable by the police.

The Chicago story is later abruptly ended by Nightwing's role in a larger company-wide crossover event. After the Crime Syndicate invades Earth-Prime after the "Trinity War" Justice League storyline and defeats the Justice League, the DC crossover story Forever Evil depicts Nightwing's capture by the Crime Syndicate, who exposes his secret identity to the world. Following their escape from the Syndicate, Batman and Catwoman decide to rescue him. He then is invited by Owlman to help defeat the Crime Syndicate, which he accepts. Nightwing is severely beaten by Ultraman and is attached to a device from a parallel world known as the Murder Machine, which is controlled by his heart rate and is reportedly impossible to escape from alive. When Batman and Lex Luthor arrive to free him, Lex stops his heart to fool the system so he can disarm it. However, Batman, enraged over what Lex has done, attacks him. Luthor explains it is not too late to save Grayson. In an uncharacteristically heroic moment, Luthor injects Grayson's heart with adrenaline, which successfully revives Grayson. Cyborg enters, having defeated Grid, and Grayson joins Batman, Cyborg, and Catwoman in freeing the Justice League from the Firestorm Matrix.

After the defeat of the Syndicate, Grayson is seen with Batman in the Batcave. Batman tells him that he has to send him on the most dangerous mission he could undertake, requiring that Grayson fakes his death. Upon the latter's refusal (saying he can't do that to his family), the two have an all-out brawl during which Batman tells him Spyral is in possession of multiple secret identities and could kill his friends and family. As Bruce monologues about knowing the magnitude of what he's asking, Dick reiterates his refusal to keep his survival from his family. He finally gains the upper hand, winning the fight. However, Dick's phyrric victory brings him no satisfaction as he feels compelled to take on the mission, even as he tells Bruce, "if you make me do this, things can never be the same with us again."

Grayson
The Nightwing title concluded in April 2014 at issue #30, and was replaced with a new title, Grayson, which depicts Dick having given up his life as Nightwing at age 22 and going undercover as an agent of the Spyral organization where the former Batwoman Kathy Kane works. Written by Tim Seeley and former CIA counter-terrorism officer Tom King, the career change for Dick Grayson comes from the urging of Batman himself, who convinces him to remain dead to the world. Seeley stated that the series will be "leaning into" Grayson's sex symbol status. The character's look also is redesigned with no mask, but a blue-and-black outfit calling back to his pre-New 52 Nightwing counterpart with an addition of a "G" on his chest, said to be reminiscent of the Robin "R".

In the "Agent of Spyral" storyline, Dick (known as Agent 37) is enlisted by Mister Minos, the director of Spyral, after having been chosen by Helena Bertinelli to serve as a new candidate. However, Dick serves as a mole under Batman due to their agenda of unmasking heroes by collecting the Paragon organs, organs which contain the DNA of the Justice League and bestows meta-bioweapons the ability to use their powers. He assists Spyral's agenda to know more about Minos and his endgame, resulting in Spyral attaining most of the scattered organs. In a later story arc, Minos betrays Spyral and attempts to leak its secrets. To his surprise, he finds the new Agent Zero, who reveals that she, along with the upper echelon of Spyral, had used Minos to attract Dick into Spyral and kills Minos as he has outlived his life full of humor.

During Batman and Robin Eternal, Grayson finds himself working with various other members of the Bat-Family when Bruce Wayne is amnesiac after his resurrection against the ruthless villain known only as "Mother", who, it is revealed, briefly met with Batman early in Grayson's career as Robin, believing that he shared her views on using trauma to make people stronger. Mother intends to trigger a global collapse with the reasoning that the survivors will rebuild a stronger world after being broken by tragedy and without the hindrance of parents to force their ideals on them, but Grayson and the rest of the Family can defeat her, Dick affirming that Batman helps the Robins become their people who can avoid the mistakes he made in dealing with his trauma rather than Mother's belief that she and Batman each teach people to use their trauma to define themselves. After the storyline, Dick meets with the restored Batman, assuring Bruce that, unlike Mother, he never forced his ideas on them, but simply gave them all an example that they chose to emulate while avoiding following it so exactly that they became like him.

When the Court of Owls plant a bomb inside Damian Wayne, they can blackmail Dick into officially joining their organization, although all sides are aware that Grayson intends to try and use his new position against them. The Grayson series ended in issue #20, wherein the final issue, it was revealed that all knowledge of Dick's identity was erased from most of the world with one of Spyral's satellites, allowing Dick to resume his superhero activities as Nightwing once again.

DC Rebirth

Starting with the DC Rebirth relaunch in 2016, Dick returned to being Nightwing with his black and blue costume, his Spyral contacts having wiped all global evidence of his dual identity and the bomb removed from Damian. He uses his new skills and expertise in espionage moving forward. Nightwing is prominently featured in two Rebirth books: the fourth volume of Nightwing, his solo book, and Titans, where Dick teams up with the other original Teen Titans after Wally West returns to the universe; through Wally, Dick remembers events of his life before Flashpoint and The New 52. After the Titans are forcibly disbanded by the Justice League, Dick creates a new Titans team after the rupture of the Source Wall consisting of Donna Troy, Raven, Steel (Natasha Irons), Beast Boy, and Miss Martian.

In his solo book, Dick is paired with a vigilante named Raptor and the two plan to bring down the Court of Owls from the inside. Barbara criticizes Dick's willingness to trust him and does not agree with his methods. Though Raptor seemed willing to play by Dick's rules of not killing, he tricks Dick into agreeing to a plan that results in the deaths of all of the Parliament of Owls in Sydney. After knocking Dick out, Raptor goes to Gotham and kidnaps Bruce during a conference. Nightwing confronts him alone in the ruins of a circus in Paris. Raptor reveals that he grew up in the circus as a child and fell in love with Dick's mother, Mary, as they stole from the rich and powerful in Paris. Raptor watched over Dick in the shadows as he grew up, and developed a hatred for Bruce Wayne as he represented everything he and Mary were against and felt it was dishonoring her memory to have Dick raised by him. Dick defeats Raptor and rescues Bruce in time.

After joining forces with the pre-Flashpoint Superman to defeat the latest attack of Doctor Destiny, Dick contemplates checking out Bludhaven, based on Superman's reference to how the pre-Flashpoint Grayson acted as the city's guardian for a time, and ultimately decides to go there. While there he meets a supervillain rehabilitation group called the Run-Offs, all of which were villains he and Batman defeated in the past. He finds that most of them are being framed for crimes around the area and works with them to find the true culprits. After solving the case and clearing their names, Dick begins dating their leader Shawn Tsang, known as the former criminal the Defacer. Shawn is kidnapped by Professor Pyg after Dick discovers she might be pregnant with his child, and he teams up with Damian to track Pyg down and rescue her. After Shawn is revealed not to be pregnant, she ultimately breaks up with Dick, who focuses his efforts on taking down criminals such as Blockbuster, the returning Raptor, the Judge, and Wyrm.

During one of his nightly patrols with Batman, Nightwing is shot by KGBeast and nearly killed. As a result, he suffered from severe memory loss and attempted to build a new life in Bludhaven. He changed his name to Ric, gave up being Nightwing, and became a taxi driver that frequently went to bars. With Bludhaven suffering from an increase in crime from the vigilante's absence, a detective named Sapienza comes across Dick's abandoned hideout in the subway and decides to become the new Nightwing. Sapienza recruits a team of his friends in law enforcement to help him, and together they make a team of Nightwings using Dick Grayson's old uniforms. In addition to Sapienza, the team consists of Malcolm Hutch, the deputy chief in the Bludhaven fire department, Zak Edwards, the vice of the 10th precinct, and Colleen Edwards, detective of the 14th precinct.

During Year of the Villain, Ric is captured by William Cobb, his grandfather who is a Talon. A brain surgeon that Bruce hired to take care of Dick after he was shot named Dr. Haas was secretly a member of the Court, who was using a mystical memory crystal to alter Dick's memories and eventually shape him into becoming a Talon himself. William Cobb forces Ric to wear goggles and puts Dick under his spell. As a Talon, Grayson fights off other Nightwing heroes. A Nightwing hero name Connor Red shoots at Grayson's mask, making his eye visible. Connor Red pleads for mercy saying he has a family, and as the sun comes up Dick Grayson suddenly breaks out of his grandfather's control. Dick Grayson starts to remember his adventures as Nightwing. Ric defeats Talon, and saves his girlfriend Bea. Afterwards, he journeys to Switzerland to learn more answers about his past from Dr. Haas, who attempts to use the crystal to alter his memories once more. However, an explosion seemingly sends her down a river to her death while Ric can retrieve the memory crystal she used on him. During the "Joker War" storyline, the Joker steals the memory crystal and uses it to brainwash Grayson into believing he is the Joker's adopted son, "Dicky Boy" and turns him against the Bat Family in his latest war against Batman. After Barbara gets the crystal back, Bea uses it to allow him to fully regain his memories as Dick Grayson.

Returning to his role as Bludhaven's protector, Grayson is informed by Barbara Gordon that he has been bequeathed a fortune by Alfred Pennyworth, accumulated during his years of service to the Wayne family. He decides to use this newfound wealth to establish a philanthropic foundation to revitalize Bludhaven, while continuing to fight corruption and crime as Nightwing. In both efforts, he is opposed by Blockbuster as well as a new villain, Heartless, who steals peoples' hearts to sustain his own life. He is supported by Barbara, who reclaims her mantle as Batgirl; Tim Drake, once again operating as Robin; the Titans; Jon Kent, who is publicly operating as Superman in his father's absence; and two unexpected new allies: the new mayor of Bludhaven, who is his previously unknown half-sister,<ref>Nightwing (vol.4) #81-82</ref> and a three-legged pit bull puppy whom Grayson adopts, naming her "Haley" (although Drake immediately dubs her "Bitewing").

Supporting characters
Enemies
Like Batman, Nightwing has faced various villains ranging from common criminals to outlandish supervillains. While the character has primarily fought other Batman villains, he also has established villains that primarily oppose him. In addition, certain Batman villains have specific enmity with Dick Grayson.

 Dixon rogues 

 Higgins rogues 

 Seeley/King Grayson rogues 

 Other rogues 

Abilities
Skills and training
Similarly to Batman, Dick Grayson possess no inherent super-powers and instead relies on his natural skills, abilities, and advanced technology. These combination of skills make Dick Grayson one of the most brilliant crime fighters on Earth in the DC Universe;  A natural prodigious athlete, Dick Grayson is considered both an expert aerialist and the greatest acrobat in the DC Universe from his training at a young age as an aerialist and later from Batman's rigorous training as sidekick and protégé as Robin. While Batman was his primary trainer, he also received some combat training from Wildcat, Richard Dragon, and espionage training from Matron.

Overtime, Dick Grayson became a master of at least a half dozen martial arts styles with an emphasis on Savate while also favoring Arnis (Escrima) and is considered second to Batman in terms of fighting abilities.  While his mastery of specific martial arts has not been specified (sans Savate & Arnis), stories over the character's history has expressed specific martial art disciplines he has exhibited including: Judo, Aikido, Capoeira, Kung Fu, Jeet Kune Do, Boxing, Hapkido, Jujutsu, Ninjutsu, Sambo, Taekwondo, and Karate. While fighting, comments from Black Mask and the first Shrike reveals that Dick Grayson combines each of his fighting styles during fights to get the better of opponents. His fighting ability and potential is enough to have garnered praise from other fellow martial artist and fighters such as Lady Shiva, Deathstroke and Ra's al Ghul, the latter whom bestowed the "Detective" title to in response to his defeat in a sword duel by Grayson. As a martial artist teacher, Dick Grayson proved capable enough to teach Tim Drake, Rose Wilson/Ravager, Thunder, and Nightrunner.

As a former apprentice to Batman, Dick Grayson is highly intelligent and is considered a world-class detective, possessing knowledge on forensic science and criminology while holding an advanced degree for the former. His detective abilities makes him among the best detectives in the DC Universe, considered among the few people (alongside Red Robin, The Question, and Elongated Man) to be second to Batman in deductive skills. Chief among his skills includes being able to analyze and read people, utilizing this skill in tandem to his leadership abilities and in combat by analyzing body language to anticipate a person's next move similarly to Cassandra Cain (mentally noting discrepancies such as blink rates, underdeveloped skills, and signs of nervousness). Dick Grayson is also considered superlative leader, tactician, and strategist, having served as a leader within Gotham, the Teen Titans, Titans, the Outsiders, and the Justice League; his leadership abilities surpasses his mentor and is described as "the most trusted hero after Superman".

One storyline suggested that if he were killed at an earlier point in time, the Justice League would fail to stop Trigon due to losing a suitable replacement for Bruce Wayne when he was inevitably killed by Darkseid in the Final Crisis event, deprived of their best tacticians. Among Grayson's other reptoire of skills includes disguise, advanced training in espionage, computer hacking, and escape artistry.

 Equipment 
Dick's parents left him a trust fund which Lucius Fox turned into a small fortune. Although it is not comparable to Bruce Wayne's wealth, it has been enough to maintain his Nightwing equipment, purchase the rights to Haly's Circus (saving Dick's former home from financial troubles), and secretly buy his former Blüdhaven apartment building at 1013 Parkthorne Avenue. As Nightwing, Grayson is typically is armed with twin Eskrima sticks made from an unbreakable polymer. He also carries several dozen modified batarangs (called wing-dings) along with de-cel jump lines and gas capsules.

 Costumes 
Dick Grayson's Robin costume alluded to the American robin and Robin Hood. The cape was alternately depicted as yellow or green. The costume also featured crakow-style shoes, which some artists would discard from the portrayal.

Dick Grayson's Nightwing costume was made of a version of the Nomex fire-resistant, triple-weave Kevlar-lined material. It was excellent protection against damage and was also insulated against electricity. Specifically tailored to his style of fighting, Nightwing's costume had fewer body-armor inlays than Batman's, anticipating a decreased need for shock absorption and an increased capacity for motion. Against opponents, both fast and strong, Nightwing had supplemental body-armor overlays that he could attach to his gauntlets, boots, shoulders, and mask. Instead of a black cape to keep him hidden, which Grayson dislikes wearing,Batman and Robin #2 the suit was light-sensitive, darkening when there was more light in the area. The mask, in the form of his symbol, was fixed in place with spirit gum, and included a built-in radio transmitter/receiver and Starlite night vision lenses. The third costume, with its stylized blue "wing" across his shoulders and extending to his hands, coloring his two middle fingers over a black bodysuit, made its first appearance in Nightwing: Ties That Bind #2 (October 1995), and was designed by the cover artist Brian Stelfreeze. His suit was also equipped with wings that allow him to glide.

As Batman, his Batsuit featured a lighter cape to accommodate his more acrobatic fighting style and a utility belt with a bat-shaped buckle. He also developed "para-capes" for his and Damian's costumes which gave them the ability to glide. Grayson is noticeably shorter than Bruce Wayne.

Post-Flashpoint with his return to Nightwing, Dick wore a similar suit, albeit with the blue "wing" being red throughout the New 52. Previously in the New 52's continuity as Nightwing, he formerly owned an armored suit which was blue and yellow, resembling a modern take on his previous first costume in the previous continuity, and another that was an armored suit that sported a red bat symbol, which is currently being used by Jason Todd though slightly modified for Jason's taste. Formerly before having to leave the Nightwing mantle post Forever Evil, his suit was made up of sturdy but flexible material that not only suited his strength in speed and acrobatics but also was durable enough to take bullets from machine guns. His former costume was a stylized red "wing" across his shoulders and extending to his hands, coloring his two middle fingers over a black torso and legs. He also has gauntlets much like Batman's own suit. Nightwing's costume is tailored specifically to his unique style of crime-fighting. He also has variants of his costume in which one of his stylized red "wings" reach only to his shoulders, another to his wrists, and one which has hip and finger stripes.

Some versions of Dick's story as Nightwing do not make clear whether the public at large knows that the first Robin is now Nightwing, or whether he is simply an entirely new hero. A metafictional foreword (said to have been made by a future historian) to a trade paperback for "A Death In The Family" claimed that the public at large always thought there was just one Robin. Inversions that do address it, Dick and Bruce seem to want to spread the belief that Nightwing started his career as an adult, the better to hide their true identities. The series Grayson seems to indicate that the public does not know, as Midnighter did not think to study Robin's techniques in preparation for his fight with Grayson, an advantage the latter exploited.

During his time as Agent 37 for Spyral, Dick uses identity-protection implants that ensure that neither cameras nor the memory of e.g. target persons can capture his face. He also was incorporated with a pair of hypnotic contact lenses which Dick used to mind control someone if they looked directly into his eye. Additionally, he still carries a pair of Escrima Sticks. He was required to carry a gun as part of Spyral protocol.

Starting with Rebirth, Dick returns to being Nightwing, once again in black and blue. The "wing" is replaced by a thinner, V-shaped bird that starts at the chest and goes up to the shoulders and around to the back. His domino mask is now blue instead of black. The shins and calves of his legs feature a big "swish" of blue. He wears a black leather strap and buckles on each of his forearms. This redesign intends to harken back to the iconic black-and-blue look of the third Nightwing costume introduced in 1995, maintain the simplicity of the aforementioned iconic look, creating a more visible-bird symbol, while also highlighting Dick's face with a lighter-colored mask and legs which can allow for more dynamic art when he is in motion.

Other versions

Amalgam Comics
In the Amalgam Universe, Dick was combined with the Marvel character Moon Knight and became Moonwing. He was a S.H.I.E.L.D. agent who selected Jason Todd as his successor when he temporarily left S.H.I.E.L.D. to attend college. As Moonwing, Jason made a careless mistake, which resulted in a S.H.I.E.L.D. agent's death, causing him to be dismissed from S.H.I.E.L.D. Jason became furious and blamed his mentors. He was then caught in an explosion when the villain Hyena detonated a bomb intended to kill Director Bruce Wayne and the Dark Claw. Despite his body never being recovered, S.H.I.E.L.D. presumed he was dead, but he survived and his body was recovered by HYDRA, who replaced his damaged body parts with robotic parts, transforming him into Deathlok. He then participated in a coup to help Madame Cat overthrow the Supreme Leader of Hydra, Lex Luthor a.k.a. the Green Skull. Afterward, he swore allegiance to her. Later, when S.H.I.E.L.D. agents launched an attack on HYDRA's base, Deathlok was sent to confront them, where he spotted his former mentor, Moonwing, and attacked him from behind. He then revealed that he has been waiting a long time to kill both Dick and Bruce. He then unmasked Moonwing and accused him and Bruce of abandoning him. He then began strangling Dick, but before he could kill him Colonel Nick Fury and Sergeant Joe Rock commandeered an aircraft and shot Deathlok several times in the back. Despite feeling sorry for Jason, Dick left Jason to die again so he could continue the attack on the HYDRA base.

Kingdom Come (Post-Infinite Crisis Earth 22)

In the Elseworlds mini-series Kingdom Come, a middle-aged Dick Grayson reclaims the Robin mantle as Red Robin and takes over his mentor's position on the Justice League. He also has a daughter, Nightstar (Mari Grayson), whom he fathered with Starfire. Nightstar aligns herself with Batman's Outsiders and is romantically involved with his and Talia al Ghul's son, Ibn al Xu'ffasch. After Ibn and Mari marry, they have a daughter and son, and thus Dick and Bruce Wayne become in-laws and grandfathers of their respective progenies' children. Dick and Bruce reconcile at the end of the story.

JLA: The Nail and JLA: Another Nail
In the Elseworlds mini-series JLA: The Nail, Dick Grayson (as Robin), along with Barbara Gordon (as Batgirl), is tortured to death by the Joker with his Kryptonian gauntlets, driving Batman temporarily insane after he witnesses their ordeals and demise. The grief-stricken hero then kills the Joker for revenge. Later, in the sequel JLA: Another Nail, Dick returns as a spirit after the Joker escapes from Hell. He helps Batman defeat the villain once and for all, and seeing Dick is at peace after his death gives Batman the strength to move on.

Batman Beyond
The 2010 comic book limited series Batman Beyond features Terry McGinnis facing a new incarnation of Hush. After ruling out Tim Drake as a suspect, Terry questions Dick Grayson who now runs an athletics training course after retiring as Nightwing due to sustaining severe gunshot wounds (including the loss of an eye) in a battle between the Joker and Batman. Though Dick gives an alibi, Hush later incapacitates Terry and removes his bandages to reveal the face of a youthful version of Dick with both eyes intact. It is later revealed that Hush is a clone of Grayson, created by Project Cadmus under the guidance of Amanda Waller to ensure that the world will always have a Batman. Hush later dies during a final confrontation with Terry, the real Dick Grayson, and a new Catwoman after they thwart the villain's plan to destroy Gotham. He is told over the comlink with Bruce that he is still his heir but Dick rips off the connection still too hurt to talk to Bruce.

Dick later serves as a supporting character for the ongoing series. When a GCPD detective discovers Dick's past as Nightwing due to Hush's recent actions, Terry and Maxine "Max" Gibson attempt to convince the public otherwise by having Terry masquerade as his former identity while Max plants numerous false alibis for Dick throughout the internet. In the end, Dick partially admits the truth to Gotham without jeopardizing his allies' secrets, claiming he was a paid agent of Batman Inc., as the new Batman. The detective who threatened to expose Dick still plans to sue Dick but is "persuaded" not to by Terry.

It is revealed that, after the events in the Batman Beyond: Return of the Joker flashbacks and after what happened to Tim, Barbara gave up her Batgirl identity and broke off her relationship with Bruce, which Dick never knew about. Barbara resumed her relationship with Dick but was hesitant to confess to him that she had dated Bruce. Dick planned to propose to Barbara. Bruce himself ultimately confessed to their relationship after finding out that he had gotten Barbara pregnant; furthermore, he wanted to be involved in the life of their child. Barbara, however, unable to leave behind her vigilante life, fought a mugger and ultimately miscarried her child. These events, as well as her sense that she destroyed the bond between Dick and Bruce, caused Barbara's relationship with Dick to disintegrate and eventually led her to marry Sam Young. Losing Barbara caused Dick to become estranged from Bruce for his role. Later on, when Terry learns about Bruce's impact on the former couple, he then sides with Grayson. In the parallel universe where the Justice Lords resides, Dick's counterpart is happily married to Barbara and they had a son named after his father, John Grayson, together. Bruce's Justice Lord counterpart was happily married to Wonder Woman as well until her Justice Lord counterpart killed him. The events in the Justice Lords' world cause Dick envying of the life his counterpart leads with his wife. Terry also becomes friends with Dick's counterpart, helping him train his own into the new Batman in Justice Lords' world.

In the 2013 Digital Comic Batman Beyond 2.0, it is revealed that Terry has now left Bruce's employment since leaving high school and is now working for Grayson as Batman with Dick taking on the role of support for Terry. While Terry finds working with Dick easier than Bruce, Dick reminds Terry of his commitment to his family and his education. During the "Mark of the Phantasm" storyline, it is revealed that Terry left Bruce after finding out he hid the truth about Jake Chill a.k.a. Vigilante's role in his father's death, which led to Terry working with Dick.

In the rebooted Batman Beyond timeline that takes place after The New 52: Futures End, Dick is now the mayor of Blüdhaven and has both eyes intact. He also has a daughter named Elaina, who became the new Batwoman in the "First Flight" storyline.

Flashpoint
In the alternate timeline of the Flashpoint event, Dick Grayson and his parents are part of the Haley Circus acrobats, featured in a show alongside Boston Brand. In a vision that Doctor Fate gives Boston Brand, Boston is standing over Dick's body. Before the next show, Boston tries to convince Dick to perform solo. However, Dick tells him that family means too much to him. Dick poses the question that Boston's seeming fearlessness could stem from his insecurity of being alone. During the attack on Haley Circus by the Amazons, Dick's mother falls to the ground in the ensuing madness. When Dick, along with the circus, is running away from the Amazons, they are rescued by the Resistance member Vertigo. While they are hiding, Dick's father is fatally wounded by the Amazons. Boston tells him to leave his father but Dick refuses. Later, Dick's dying father makes Boston promise to protect his son. Afterwards, Dick and Boston run in the countryside looking for reinforcements, when they are soon caught in an explosion. Dick survived, but his friend Boston is killed. When he walks toward his friend's body, he is unaware of the fact that he walks through the ghost of Boston. Dick manages to kill the Amazons (including Starfire, who had joined with them) in a gasoline explosion. Meeting up with the Resistance, Dick becomes the new Doctor Fate. He is aided by the ghostly Boston, who lets him know that he is not alone.

Earth 2 (New 52)
On Earth 2, Dick Grayson is a journalist who is forced to live in a survival camp with his son John and his wife Barbara Gordon due to an invasion of Parademons. After the fatal shooting of his wife, the disappearance of his son, and the death of the second Batman, Dick becomes the third Batman of Earth 2 where he attempts to diminish crime following the end of Convergence. He is later reunited with John, who in turn becomes the new Robin of Earth 2. Later, Dick becomes a wheelchair user and adopts a new alias as Oracle while Helena Wayne becomes the fourth Batman with John fighting by her side as her Robin.

Injustice: Gods Among Us
In the alternate world of Injustice: Gods Among Us, Dick remains firmly aligned with Batman's views of law and order even as Superman begins a more forceful approach to ending crime. When he announces his plan to take away the inhabitants of Arkham Asylum, Dick joins Batman is going to stop him. Batman's biological son Damian, however, believes in Superman's cause and sides with him. During a skirmish at the asylum Damian inadvertently kills Dick by throwing his kali stick at him, causing Dick to fall over and break his neck when he lands on a rock positioned in just the wrong location. After this action, Batman and Damian's relationship as father and son ends, Bruce later proclaims that Dick was his son and Damian lost the right to that title after Dick's death.

In the Year Two annual, Clayface takes the form of Dick to infiltrate Barbara Gordon's base for Superman but is eventually discovered and stopped by Jim Gordon, Barbara, and the Birds of Prey.

In the Year Three series, Dick's spirit is called upon by the dying Deadman to replace him, allowing Dick to return to action as he investigates who the Spectre is after finding Jim Corrigan, under the influence of Joker Venom, in Arkham Asylum. Near the end of the series, he has a talk with Bruce about how he has no regrets about his life despite the way it ended, declaring love for his adopted father. It is revealed in the annual that before his death he left the Titans to join the Justice League. After the explosion kills Beast Boy and Kid Flash he warns the Titans to stay out of anything to do with Superman. He also had romantic feelings for Starfire at one point, as she urges him to rejoin the Titans, but Dick insists that Batman needs him by his side.

In chapter 14 of Year Five, he returns to watch over Damian, who has been going through an identity crisis. As the youth goes on to fight several criminals at once Dick notes that while Damian has great skills he is reckless and arrogant and is forced to intervene when Damian is overwhelmed. He leaves his old outfit with Damian and bemoans that Damian chose to leave Batman, as it has allowed him to fall for the dark influence Superman has.

Superman/Batman: Generations
Dick Grayson is first seen going off to college in a scene set in 1949, after working with Batman for almost ten years, going on to become a lawyer in New York. At some point between 1959 and 1969, Dick takes on the mantle of Batman with Bruce Wayne Jr. as Robin after Bruce is forced to retire due to old age. Dick is killed by the Joker's latest scheme in 1969, with Bruce Jr. taking Dick's costume so the legacy of Batman can live on, claiming that the Joker 'merely' killed Robin. In Superman/Batman: Generations 2, Dick's ghost begins haunting the Joker in 1975. With the help of Deadman, Doctor Occult, and the ghost of Alfred Pennyworth, Dick and Alfred go into the light, Alfred convincing Dick that tormenting the Joker can serve no purpose but to risk Dick's soul, now that the Joker is so close to dying of natural causes.

Smallville: Season 11
In the comic book continuation of the television series Smallville, Dick is Barbara Gordon's boyfriend, who becomes her successor as Nightwing and Batman's replacement partner after she becomes a Blue Lantern. Unlike previous depictions, Dick was never Bruce Wayne's ward and protégé as Robin and has referred that he was a former circus acrobat-turned-police officer before becoming Batman's new partner, in the ranks of detectives within the Gotham City Police Department.

Nightwing: The New Order
In this alternate reality, Nightwing ends an ongoing feud between superpowered beings by activating a device that depowers ninety percent of the super-powered population. This builds to a future where superpowers are outlawed and any super-powered being must take inhibitor medications or be contained and studied should the medications not work on them. Grayson's identity is exposed but is honored as a hero by the public for eliminating superpowers to ensure the safety of the planet. He becomes the leader of a government task force known as The Crusaders and hunts down super-powered individuals. In his off time, he raises his and Starfire's son, Jake, who soon develops his mother's powers and puts Dick at odds with the system he helped create. After allying with the Titans to help Jake escape, Dick tries to leave with his son, but Jake convinces him to aid the Titans and Superman in restoring the world's superpowers. Dick spent his remaining days watching his son grow into a responsible adult and teaching super-powered children how to control their abilities. As an adult, Jake eventually has a son of his own named Richard in honor of his father.

The Gift
In an alternate timeline where Booster Gold prevents the murder of Thomas and Martha Wayne, Gotham has become a war zone of criminals and the Joker has become a sort of terrorist with no one to stop him. Dick Grayson is the one and only Batman who uses lethal force.

The Dark Knight Strikes Again
In the timeline Dick Grayson was fired by Batman for "Cowardice and Incompetence", years of physical and emotional abuse by Batman drove him mad, teaming up with Lex Luthor and Brainiac he undergoes radical gene therapy, he develops shape-shifting and rapid healing powers, he takes the form of Joker to mock the other superheroes, in the showdown he tries to rape and murder Carrie Kelley when Batman activates the self destruct for the Batcave, Grayson tries to use the cancel password, Batman tells him he changed the password the night he fired him, Batman tells Grayson the Batcave is above a lava pit, and Grayson falls to his death.

DC vs Vampires
An elseworld in which multiple prominent heroes including Wonder Woman and Superman are turned into vampires. The secret vampire king is finally revealed to be Dick Grayson in issue #6 where he reveals his identity and kills Batman, Red Robin, and Red Hood.

Harley Quinn: The Animated Series
Although he did not appear in the main show until Season 3, Dick Grayson appears as Nightwing in The Eat Bang Kill Tour, which is set after the events of Season 2. He is shown to still be based in Bludhaven, where he runs into Harley and Ivy, who are on the run from Commissioner Gordon during their cross-country road trip.

Dick later appears in Legion of Bats!'', taking place after Season 3, where he works with the Bat Family (sans Batman) alongside a morally-confused Harley to fight against the rise of Black Mask.

In other media
Dick Grayson appears in multiple television (live-action and animated) series, films, video games, and radio-related to DC superheroes.

Collected editions

See also

 List of Batman supporting characters
 List of DC Comics characters
 Robin (character)
 Nightwing
 Red X

References

External links

 Titans Tower: Nightwing
 Nightwing at DC Comics' official website
 Nightwing at BatmanYTB
 Index of Dick Grayson (Earth-1) appearances at Mike's Amazing World of Comics
 Index of Dick Grayson (Earth-2) appearances at Mike's Amazing World of Comics
 
 Dick Grayson on IMDb

 
Alternative versions of Batman
Batman characters
Characters created by Bill Finger
Characters created by Bob Kane
Comics characters introduced in 1940
DC Comics American superheroes
DC Comics male superheroes
DC Comics martial artists
DC Comics television characters
DC Comics sidekicks
DC Comics orphans
DC Comics child superheroes
Fictional acrobats
Fictional American police detectives
Fictional American secret agents
Fictional blade and dart throwers
Fictional criminologists
Fictional escapologists
Fictional gymnasts
Fictional stick-fighters
Fictional Jeet Kune Do practitioners
Fictional taekwondo practitioners
Fictional judoka
Fictional karateka
Fictional Shaolin kung fu practitioners
Fictional Wing Chun practitioners
Fictional Brazilian jiu-jitsu practitioners
Fictional aikidoka
Fictional hapkido practitioners
Fictional savateurs
Fictional trapeze artists
Fictional eskrimadors
Fictional victims of sexual assault
Fighting game characters
Gotham City Police Department officers
Romani comics characters
Superheroes who are adopted
Robin (character)
Vigilante characters in comics